The Carajás woodcreeper (Xiphocolaptes carajaensis) is a species of bird in the Dendrocolaptinae subfamily, the woodcreepers. Also considered by some as a subspecies of X. promeropirhynchus.
It is found in the state of Pará, Brazil.

References

Xiphocolaptes
Birds of Brazil